Villasis, officially the Municipality of Villasis,  is a 1st class municipality in the province of Pangasinan, Philippines. According to the 2020 census, it has a population of 65,047 people.

Villasis is a farming town situated along the Agno River. On its borders are the towns of Malasiqui (on the west), Urdaneta City (on the north), Asingan (on the east), and Rosales and Santo Tomas (on the south). Hemmed between two bustling areas, Urdaneta City and Rosales, Villasis is one of the fastest developing towns in the province. It also thrives on its rice, corn and tobacco plantations. Its hilly barangays situated along the Malasiqui boundary is an ideal place for resort developers and agri-businessmen.

The town holds an annual fiesta in honor of its patron saint, San Antonio de Abad (Saint Anthony the Abbot).

Geography

Barangays
Villasis is politically subdivided into 21 barangays. These barangays are headed by elected officials: Barangay Captain, Barangay Council, whose members are called Barangay Councilors. All are elected every three years.

Climate

Demographics

Religion

Saint Anthony the Abbot Parish Church 
The heritage Saint Anthony the Abbot Parish Church, built in 1763, is part of the Roman Catholic Diocese of Urdaneta (from the Archdiocese of Lingayen-Dagupan). Feast Day: January 17; Parish Priest: Father Arturo F. Aquino & Parochial Vicar: Father Dionisio B. Luzano.

Economy

The town's accessibility to all kinds of land transportation has made Villasis a bustling center of trade and commerce. It is intersected by the Manila North Road from north to south, allowing all major bus lines plying the Manila-Region I CAR route to pass through the town 24-hours a day. The main agricultural crops of the town are rice, corn, cassava, and varieties of vegetables and fruits. Raising livestock is another livelihood of the townspeople who raise poultry, swine, goat and cattle.

There are 56 registered small to medium-sized industries in Villasis. These include rice mills, metalcraft industries, cement production, poultry raising and piggeries and an ice-plant.

Government
Villasis, belonging to the fifth congressional district of the province of Pangasinan, is governed by a mayor designated as its local chief executive and by a municipal council as its legislative body in accordance with the Local Government Code. The mayor, vice mayor, and the councilors are elected directly by the people through an election which is being held every three years.

Elected officials

Culture

Talong festival
On January 18, 2008, Mayor Nonato Abrenica announced that hundreds of balikbayans joined the annual fiesta celebration, highlighted by the Talong Festival / fastest talong eater contest (boiled skin removed eggplant, long-purple casino type), in Villasis, Pangasinan. 12 of 21 villages / barangays are engaged in eggplant production with total of 3.35 km2 planted by 600 residents. It is usually celebrated during the second week of January.

Gallery

References

External links

 Villasis Profile at PhilAtlas.com
 Municipal Profile at the National Competitiveness Council of the Philippines
 Villasis at the Pangasinan Government Website
 Local Governance Performance Management System
 [ Philippine Standard Geographic Code]
 Philippine Census Information

Municipalities of Pangasinan
Populated places on the Agno River